Agrarian Trade Union Federation (in Spanish: Federación Sindical Agraria) was a national-syndicalist trade union in Spain, founded in 1933 in Castile. The federation was linked to the Juntas de Ofensiva Nacional-Sindicalista.

Sources
 La Organización Sindical Española, Escuela Sindical 1961. 1961: Madrid, page 33.

Trade unions in Spain
National syndicalism
Fascist trade unions

Trade unions established in 1933